The Brisbane Lions' 2015 season was the 19th season in the Australian Football League (AFL).

Overview

Playing list changes

The following summarises all player changes between the conclusion of the 2014 season and the commencement of the 2015 season.

In

Out

Season summary

Pre-season matches

Premiership Season

Home and away season

Ladder

Awards, Records & Milestones

Awards

Records

Milestones

Brownlow Medal

Results

Brownlow Medal tally

 italics denotes ineligible player

Tribunal cases

References

Brisbane Lions Season, 2015
Brisbane Lions seasons